In enzymology, a cyanocobalamin reductase (cyanide-eliminating) is an enzyme that catalyzes the chemical reaction

cob(I)alamin + cyanide + NADP+  cyanocob(III)alamin + NADPH + H+

The 3 substrates of this enzyme are cob(I)alamin, cyanide, and NADP+, whereas its 3 products are cyanocob(III)alamin, NADPH, and H+.

This enzyme belongs to the family of oxidoreductases, specifically those that oxidize metal ions and use NAD+ or NADP+ as an electron acceptor (for that oxidization reaction).  The systematic name of this enzyme class is cob(I)alamin, cyanide:NADP+ oxidoreductase. Other names in common use include cyanocobalamin reductase, cyanocobalamin reductase (NADPH, cyanide-eliminating), cyanocobalamin reductase (NADPH, CN-eliminating), and NADPH:cyanocob(III)alamin oxidoreductase (cyanide-eliminating).  This enzyme participates in porphyrin and chlorophyll metabolism.  It uses one cofactor, FAD.

References

 

EC 1.16.1
NADPH-dependent enzymes
Flavoproteins
Enzymes of unknown structure